Riccardo Palmieri (born 26 September 1995) is an Italian professional footballer who plays as a midfielder for  club Carrarese.

Career
Born in Lodi, Palmieri was formed as a player in Inter Milan youth sector. As a senior, he played in Serie D between 2014 and 2021.

On 2 August 2021, he signed with Serie C club Fiorenzuola. Palmieri made his professional debut on 28 August 2021 against FeralpiSalò.

On 31 January 2022, he moved to Virtus Entella.

On 19 January 2023, Palmieri signed a 1.5-year contract with Carrarese.

References

External links
 
 

1995 births
Living people
People from Lodi, Lombardy
Sportspeople from the Province of Lodi
Footballers from Lombardy
Italian footballers
Association football midfielders
Serie C players
Serie D players
Inter Milan players
Modena F.C. 2018 players
Piacenza Calcio 1919 players
U.S.D. Olginatese players
Sondrio Calcio players
A.S.D. Fanfulla players
U.S. Fiorenzuola 1922 S.S. players
Virtus Entella players
Carrarese Calcio players